The 1995 Birkin Cars/TVR Invitational Race was a non-championship Formula 3000 race held at the Kyalami Grand Prix Circuit in South Africa. Jan Lammers won the race after passing polesitter Kenny Bräck in the first turn.

Summary
Number two starter Jan Lammers had a very good start and passed polesitter Kenny Bräck for the lead in the opening lap. Lammers opened up a gap towards Bräck having a seven-second advantage at one point. South African driver Stephen Watson was running in fourth place until he tried to overtake Richard Dean. This resulted in Watson losing two spots. Less than a lap later he went off course attempting to overtake another driver. He damaged his rear wing and had to retire. Near the end of the race Bräck was closing in on Lammers. But as he attempted a pass for the lead the Swedish driver spun. As he completed a perfect 360 degree spin he did not lose a spot but could not threaten Lammers for the win.

Classification

Qualifying

Race result

References

International Formula 3000
1995 in motorsport
1995 in South African sport